HMS Edgar was a 72-gun third rate ship of the line of the Royal Navy, built by Baylie of Bristol and launched in 1668. The diarist and naval administrator Samuel Pepys visited the town during its construction, noting that in his opinion, "it will be a fine ship". By 1685 she was carrying 74 guns.

In May 1689 Edgar saw action in the Nine Years' War under the command of Cloudesley Shovell, who later became Admiral of the Fleet and after injuries in the Scilly naval disaster of 1707 he would die. During this war, Edgar was present at the first fight of the Battle of Bantry Bay when a French fleet was landing troops against King William III.

In 1700 Edgar underwent a rebuild at Portsmouth Dockyard as a 70-gun ship. She was rebuilt for a second time by Burchett of Rotherhithe as a 70-gun ship to the 1706 Establishment, relaunching on 31 March 1709.

Edgar was destroyed by fire at Spithead, Hampshire in 1711. All on board perished. The wrecked was cleared in May 1844.

Notes

References

Lavery, Brian (2003) The Ship of the Line - Volume 1: The development of the battlefleet 1650-1850. Conway Maritime Press. .
Maps made by; Heather (1797), Faden (1796), Bellin (1762) 

Ships of the line of the Royal Navy
1660s ships
Ships built in Portsmouth
Ships built in Rotherhithe
Shipwrecks in the English Channel